Fishers Landing is a hamlet and census-designated place (CDP) in the town of Orleans in Jefferson County, New York, United States. It is just southwest of Grass Point State Park in the Thousand Islands region of New York. As of the 2010 census the community had a population of 89.

Geography
Fishers Landing is in the northern part of the town of Orleans, on the south bank of the St. Lawrence River where it enters the American Narrows, a channel separating the mainland from Wellesley Island (also part of the town of Orleans). There is a local marina where island owners and visitors park their car/boat while traveling to and from the mainland. The Rock Island Light, a New York state park, is  out in the channel from Fishers Landing, and the community of Thousand Island Park is directly across the channel on Wellesley Island.

New York State Route 180 intersects Route 12 at Fishers Landing, leading south  to La Fargeville.

Demographics

See also
 A.E. Vickery
 NEPCO 140 oil spill

References

Hamlets in New York (state)
Census-designated places in Jefferson County, New York
Census-designated places in New York (state)
Hamlets in Jefferson County, New York